Basa (Pangasius bocourti) is a species of catfish in the family Pangasiidae. Basa are native to the Mekong and Chao Phraya basins in Mainland Southeast Asia. These fish are important food fish with an international market. They are often labelled in North America and Australia as "basa fish", "swai", or "bocourti". In the UK all species of Pangasius may legally be described as "river cobbler", "cobbler", "basa", "pangasius", "panga", or any of these with the addition of "catfish". In the rest of Europe, these fish are commonly marketed as "pangasius" or "panga". In Asian markets, names for basa include "Pacific dory" and "patin". Other related shark catfish may occasionally be incorrectly labeled as basa fish, including P. hypophthalmus (iridescent shark) and P. pangasius (yellowtail catfish).

Description
The body of the basa is stout and heavy. The rounded head is broader than it is long, with the blunt snout having a white band on its muzzle.

Ecology and lifecycle 
Basa fish feed on plants.

Market

Some basa fish are labelled as swai; they are often mislabelled as tonguefish in China.

"Catfish war" in the U.S.
In 2002, the United States accused Vietnam of dumping catfish, namely P. bocourti and P. hypophthalmus, on the American market, arguing that the Vietnamese exporters, who are subsidised by Vietnam's government, constituted unfair competition.
With pressures from the U.S. catfish industry, the United States Congress passed a law in 2003 preventing the imported fish from being labelled as catfish, as well as imposing additional tariffs on the imported fish. Under the U.S. Food and Drug Administration ruling, only species from the family Ictaluridae can be sold as true catfish. As a result, the Vietnamese exporters of this fish now label their products sold in the U.S. as basa fish, striped pangasius, swai or bocourti.

At the height of the "catfish war", U.S. catfish farmers and others were describing the imported catfish as an inferior product. However, Mississippi State University researchers found imported basa were preferred three-to-one to US catfish in a small (58 testers) blind taste test.

United Kingdom
Basa has become common in the UK as "Vietnamese river cobbler", "river cobbler", or "basa". It is mainly sold by large supermarkets, in both fresh and frozen forms, as a cheaper alternative to popular white fish such as cod or haddock. Young's uses it in some of its frozen fish products, under the name basa. The import of basa is subject to the same stringent EU regulations as other food imports, as set out in the CBI pangasius product fact sheet UK Trading Standards officers said that cobbler was being fraudulently sold as cod by some fish-and-chip retailers to take advantage of the much lower price of cobbler, which was about half that of cod. This practice was highlighted by the successful prosecution of two retailers, using DNA evidence, in 2009 and 2010. Sometimes pangasius is described, legally, simply as "fish", as in "fish and chips".

Environmental and health concerns
Several environmental organisations concerned with marine ecosystems have raised concerns about basa.  OceanWise, an environmental organisation associated with the Vancouver Aquarium, has flagged farmed basa for its potential pollution of ecosystems and interference with wild species. It writes, "Open cage farming in Southeast Asia is associated with disease transfer to wild basa. There are also concerns about feed quality, farm operating standards and the biological impact of using wild stock for culturing." The Monterey Bay Aquarium currently lists the basa in its "red flag" or "avoid" category. Both groups cite USA farmed catfish as a more sustainable alternative.

Tests by the Asda and Tesco supermarkets in the UK have found no trace of toxic contaminants. Testing from AQIS found trace levels of malachite green, but no other contaminants.

One case has been reported of a person without a general fish allergy having an anaphylactic reaction to pangasius.

References

Further reading 
 Kulabtong, Sitthi. "Biology and Culture Techniques of Bocourti Catfish, Pangasius bocourti Sauvage, 1880 in Thailand". Veridian E-Journal, Silpakorn University, 5(3): 411–419, 2012.

Pangasiidae
Catfish of Asia
Fish of the Mekong Basin
Fish of Cambodia
Fish of Laos
Fish of Thailand
Fish of Vietnam
Commercial fish
Fish described in 1880